"Put On a Happy Face" is a popular song with lyrics by Lee Adams and music by Charles Strouse. It was introduced by Dick Van Dyke in the musical Bye Bye Birdie.

References 

1960 songs
Songs from musicals
Songs with lyrics by Lee Adams
Songs with music by Charles Strouse